This is a list of the highest mountain peaks of Africa. It aims to include the highest mountain peaks with a prominence of at least 500 m. Some regions are still poorly described and the list is likely to be both incomplete and not completely accurate.  This is especially true for the Ethiopian Highlands, where heights on maps and in the literature differ between each other by up to 500 m. All elevations have been checked or chosen to match the SRTM-based contour lines in the Google terrain maps.

The highest African mountain is Kilimanjaro, which has three peaks, named Kibo, Mawenzi and Shira, of which Kibo is the tallest. Mount Kenya is the second highest mountain in Africa which also has three main peaks, namely Batian, Nelion and Lenana Point.

See also

Notes

Sources
Jamish Brown, Climbing in the Atlas Mountains, The Alpine Journal, 2002, pp. 81–91.
Des Clark, Mountaineering in the Moroccan High Atlas, Cicerone, 2011
Bernhard Lindahl, Local History of Ethiopia, 2005/2008 (for verification of names)
 Lists and/or maps covering all peaks in the world with 1500 m+ prominence at Peaklist.org

 (an unverified list)

 
Africa
 Highest
Africa